La Fuerza del Destino ("The Force of Destiny") may refer to:

La Fuerza del Destino (album), a 2004 album by Mexican singer Fey
La fuerza del destino (TV series), a 2011 Mexican telenovela
"La Fuerza del Destino", a 1988 song by Mecano from their album Descanso Dominical

See also
La forza del destino, an 1862 opera by Giuseppe Verdi